Taeneremina is a genus of moths in the family Noctuidae. It contains only one species, Taeneremina scripta, which is found in Taiwan.

References

Xyleninae
Monotypic moth genera